Snow Hill is an unincorporated community in Kanawha County, West Virginia, United States.

The community was descriptively named on account of nearby salt deposits.

References

Unincorporated communities in Kanawha County, West Virginia
Unincorporated communities in West Virginia